Bulimulus calvus is a species of  tropical air-breathing land snail, a pulmonate gastropod mollusc in the subfamily Bulimulinae.

This species is endemic to Ecuador.  It is threatened by habitat loss.

References

calvus
Endemic gastropods of the Galápagos Islands
Taxonomy articles created by Polbot